The Indomito class was a class of destroyers of the Italian Royal Navy before and during World War I. Six were built at Naples by Societa Pattison between 1910 and 1913. They were the first large Italian destroyers and the first fitted with steam turbines. The class is sometimes also called the I class. Two of the class were sunk during World War I, but the four surviving ships remained in service until 1937–38. One of the class, was reinstated during World War II and served in the Règia Marina and the German Kriegsmarine before being sunk by U.S. aircraft in late 1944.

Design and construction 
The Indomito class was designed by Luigi Scaglia of Societa Pattison of Naples. The boats were the first large destroyers of the Règia Marina and the first fitted with steam turbines. The Indomito class were the first in the progression of Italian destroyers to be called either tre pipe or tre canne for their three funnels.

They had twin shafts driven by two Tosi steam turbines that were fired by four Thornycroft boilers.

As built, the ships were armed with one /40 gun, four /40 guns, and two  torpedo tubes. In 1914 they were augmented with an additional two torpedo tubes. During World War I, guide rails for laying up to ten mines were added to the ships. Later wartime changes replaced all the guns with five /35 and a single /39  AA gun.

Service career 

The remaining four ships all survived the war and were reclassified as torpedo boats in 1929. The remaining four ships were stricken 1937–38. , however, was reinstated on 1 March 1941. Reduced to two funnels and rearmed, she served as a target ship, a convoy escort, and served in an anti-submarine warfare role. She was scuttled by her crew on 10 September 1943 at Pola, but was raised by the Germans who commissioned her as Wildfang on 8 November. Wildfang, the last surviving member of the Indomito class, was sunk by U.S. aircraft on 5 November 1944 after just under one year of German service.

Ships

Notes

References

Bibliography

External links
 
 Indomito-class destroyer (1910) Marina Militare website

 
Destroyer classes
Destroyers of the Regia Marina
World War I naval ships of Italy